Gyula Thürmer (born 14 April 1953) is a Hungarian communist politician and a former diplomat, who has been the chairman of the Hungarian Workers' Party since its formation on 17 December 1989.

Works
 Nem kell NATO! (1995), Progressio Kft.
 Balszemmel (book series, 2006–), Progressio Kft.
 Az elsikkasztott ország (2009), Korona Kiadó
 25 év árral szemben (2014), Progressio Kft.

References

External links 
 Biography (in Hungarian)
 Interview with Gyula Thürmer (visegradpost - 2016)

1953 births
Living people
Politicians from Budapest
Members of the Hungarian Socialist Workers' Party
Hungarian communists

Hungarian Workers' Party politicians